The 2003–04 season was the 58th season in Rijeka's history. It was their 13th season in the Prva HNL and 30th successive top tier season.

Competitions

Prva HNL

First stage

Second stage (championship play-off)

Results summary

Results by round

Matches

Prva HNL

Source: HRnogomet.com

Croatian Cup

Source: HRnogomet.com

Squad statistics
Competitive matches only.  Appearances in brackets indicate numbers of times the player came on as a substitute.

See also
2003–04 Prva HNL
2003–04 Croatian Cup

References

External links
 2003–04 Prva HNL at HRnogomet.com
 2003–04 Croatian Cup at HRnogomet.com 
 Prvenstvo 2003.-2004. at nk-rijeka.hr

HNK Rijeka seasons
Rijeka